Gaby Moreno is a Guatemalan singer-songwriter, producer, film composer and guitarist. Singing in both English and Spanish, Moreno's music covers many genres including Latin, Alternative, Blues, Folk and Americana.

Early life
Moreno was born in Guatemala, and later moved to Los Angeles.

Reception
Moreno has been received positively by Al Borde, KCRW, Latina, NBC Latino, NPR (including All Things Considered, Alt. Latino, and Tiny Desk Concerts), Orlando Weekly, and The New York Times.

The music video for Fuiste Tu, her duet with Ricardo Arjona, has amassed over 1 billion views on Youtube.

"This Guatemalan American singer-songwriter alternates fluidly between languages, whether spoken (English and Spanish) or musical, easing in and out of everything from folksy alt country to retro blues rock  …Plucky, quirky and insightful, Moreno has the grace and the skill to make it big." – Rhapsody: No. 3 in Top 10 Latin Alt Albums of Spring 2011

In 2012 she was listed as one of the "5 Latinos to Look Out for in 2012" by NBC Latino.

Career

Music 
In August 2009, Moreno toured with Tracy Chapman. Later, in November 2009, Moreno toured as direct support for Ani Difranco on an East Coast tour. Difranco invited Moreno back out on tour in January and February 2010. In July 2010 Moreno went on tour in Germany (e.g. in Constance, Heidelberg, and Ravensburg) and France.

In early 2011 Moreno and her band played their first headlining tour. They toured through the Netherlands and Belgium performing as part of the "World Sessions" tour. In addition, Moreno and her band opened as direct support for Nouvelle Vague for three shows in Germany. In late 2011 Gaby toured the U.S. East coast as direct support for The Milk Carton Kids.

Moreno played some concerts in France in February 2012. Later that spring, she performed with Ricardo Arjona during his "Metamorfosis World Tour". In June Moreno performed on "The Tonight Show with Jay Leno" to commemorate 50 years of Amnesty International, together with Kris Kristofferson and others. Throughout May and June Moreno played concerts in Ireland ("Electric Burma" in honor of Aung San Suu Kyi together with Bono, Damien Rice, Bob Geldof, Angelique Kidjo, etc.), Germany, France, and London (with Van Dyke Parks) In July Moreno played concerts in France, including Le Havre, Verdun, and Paris.

In 2013 she toured with Hugh Laurie and The Copper Bottom Band through Europe, in March 2014 in South America, namely Argentina, Brazil, and Mexico.

In 2015 Moreno played at Festival Acústico under the name "Gaby Moreno y amigos". On 28 February the first day of the festival included performances of Óscar Isaac, Sara Watkins, and Ishto Jueves. On 1 March: Gaby Moreno gave her second concert of the festival. After her performance of the songs Ave que Migra and Blues de Mar, she introduced her guest, Devorah Rahel, with whom she played the song Y Tu Sombra. Her next guest was El Gordo, followed by Ishto Jueves. Gaby also played a song called Maldición, Bendición.

In March 2015 Moreno went on tour in Europe:

 19 March 2015: Theater Akzent – Vienna, Austria (The first time she played in Vienna)
 20 March 2015: Casino Kulturraum – Friedrichshafen, Germany
 21 March 2015: La Spirale – Fribourg, Switzerland
 24 March 2015: Cankar Centre – Ljubljana, Slovenia
On 24 July 2015 Moreno performed at the Lincoln Center in New York City with Out of Doors. Starting in 2016, Moreno became a reoccurring guest on Live From Here.

In 2018 Moreno released a cover of Trinidadian artist David Rudder's 1998 song "The Immigrants," made with arranger and producer Van Dyke Parks, ahead of the 4 July holiday, with proceeds going to benefit CARECEN.

¡Spangled!, a collaboration between Gaby Moreno and Van Dyke Parks, was released in 2020 on Metamorfosis & Nonesuch Records. The album includes a bolero from Panama, a bossa nova from Brazil, a song by Moreno, David Rudder's "The Immigrants," and Ry Cooder, John Hiatt, and Jim Dickinson's song "Across the Borderline," performed with Cooder and Jackson Browne.

Composition 
As a composer, Moreno recorded and produced the score for the feature film Language Lessons (directed by Natalie Morales) and received an Emmy nomination for “Outstanding Original Main Title Theme Song” for the theme song to NBC’s show Parks and Recreation.

In 2022, Moreno released a full-length album Dreamers Dream On with her three-part harmony side project, The SongBirds, and released her self-produced seventh solo studio album Alegoría, which has earned her a second GRAMMY nomination.

Television 
Moreno sings the theme song and voices a character (Marlena) for the Disney children’s television series, Elena of Avalor. Her version of the song Cucurrucucú Paloma was featured in a key scene during the last season of the Netflix original show Orange Is The New Black.

Moreno appeared alongside Rupert Grint in a Catherine Hardwicke-directed episode of Guillermo del Toro's Cabinet of Curiosities. Moreno also collaborated with composer Heitor Pereira to write and perform the song "Por Que Te Vas" for DreamWorks Animation’s Puss in Boots: The Last Wish.

Discography

Albums 
 2009: Still the Unknown (released independently)
 2010: A Good Old Christmastime EP (released independently)
 2011: European release of Still the Unknown (World Connection Records)
 2011: Illustrated Songs (released independently)
 2012: European release of Illustrated Songs (World Connection Records)
 2012: Postales (Metamorfosis)
 2014: Posada (Christmas Album)
 2016: Illusion
 2019: ¡Spangled! (a collaboration with Van Dyke Parks through Nonesuch Records)
 2022: Alegoría (Metamorfosis)

Singles 
 2009: Smile – The Cove – sang the song "Smile" (written by Charlie Chaplin)
 2010: Quizas – cover song
 2017: He Ain't Heavy, He's My Brother – cover song in collaboration with Mike Garson
 2018: The Immigrants – in collaboration with Van Dyke Parks

Filmography

Film

Television

Awards and nominations
In 2006, she won the Grand Prize in the John Lennon Song writing Contest with her song "Escondidos," first in the Latin category, then overall.

In 2010, Moreno was awarded "Favourite American Latino Indie Artist" at the American Latino Awards (run by American Latino TV).

Grammy Awards:
|-
| 2017 || Ilusión || Best Latin Pop Album || 
|-
Latin Grammy Awards:

|-
| rowspan=1|2012 ||rowspan=1|"Fuiste Tú" || Record of the Year || 
|-
| 2013 || Gaby Moreno || Best New Artist || 
|-
| 2020 || ¡Spangled! || Best Traditional Pop Vocal Album ||
|-
| 2021 || Bolero de la vida (with Omara Portuondo)|| Best Tropical Song ||

References

External links

 

1981 births
Living people
Guatemalan guitarists
Guatemalan women singer-songwriters
Latin Grammy Award for Best New Artist
Guatemalan people of Spanish descent
21st-century Guatemalan singers
21st-century women singers
21st-century guitarists
Women in Latin music
21st-century women guitarists